Ivan Šantek (23 April 1932 – 14 April 2015) was a Croatian football player. He was born in Zagreb.

International career
Šantek made his debut for Yugoslavia in a November 1956 Summer Olympics match against the United States and earned a total of 6 caps, scoring no goals. He was a participant at the 1956 Summer Olympics and the 1958 FIFA World Cup. His final international was a September 1958 friendly match away against Austria.

References

External links
 
Serbian national football team website 
Biography of Ivan Šantek 

1932 births
2015 deaths
Footballers from Zagreb
Association football defenders
Yugoslav footballers
Yugoslavia international footballers
Olympic footballers of Yugoslavia
Olympic silver medalists for Yugoslavia
Footballers at the 1956 Summer Olympics
Olympic medalists in football
Medalists at the 1956 Summer Olympics
1958 FIFA World Cup players
NK Zagreb players
GNK Dinamo Zagreb players
FC Wacker Innsbruck players
WSG Tirol players
Yugoslav First League players
Austrian Football Bundesliga players
Yugoslav expatriate footballers
Expatriate footballers in Austria
Yugoslav expatriate sportspeople in Austria